The Ottawa Little Theatre, originally called the Ottawa Drama League at its inception in 1913, is the longest continuously running community theatre in Canada, and one of the oldest in North America. Based in Canada's capital city, it owns its own 360-seat theatre where it presents three-week runs of nine plays per season from September through July.

The OLT's longevity and success are impressive, especially as it receives no regular government funding. In 1970, when the Little Theatre (originally a church that had been renovated in 1928) was completely destroyed by fire, the OLT built and opened a new theatre on the same site within two years, and retired the debt within five years. The OLT's income is generated almost entirely from ticket sales and donations. All its directors, actors, designers and stage crew are volunteers.

A number of Canadian actors have performed on the OLT stage, including Amelia Hall, Saul Rubinek, Rich Little, Robert MacNeil, Dan Aykroyd, Adam Beach, Luba Goy and Raoul Bhaneja. Famed photographer Yousuf Karsh also has a rich history with the Ottawa Little Theatre  developing his lighting techniques while photographing multiple productions in the 1930s. It was there that he met his first wife, Solonge. The theatre has several original photographs of Karsh on display.

The Dominion Drama Festival, founded in 1933, took place at the Little Theatre for its first five years.

In 1937, the theatre launched a National One-Act Playwriting Competition which continues to this day. Winners have included Robertson Davies, John Murrell, Erika Ritter, Catherine Banks and Ken Mitchell.

The Ottawa Little Theatre's website includes a searchable database of Past Productions with cast and crew members as well as photographs from the more than 1,000 plays that have been performed throughout its history.

Gallery

References

External links
Official website

Theatre companies in Ontario
Theatres in Ottawa
Theatres completed in 1913
1913 establishments in Ontario